Mintonia is a genus of Southeast Asian jumping spiders that was first described by F. R. Wanless in 1984.

Species
 it contains ten species, found in Malaysia, Singapore, Thailand, and Indonesia:
Mintonia breviramis Wanless, 1984 – Borneo
Mintonia caliginosa Wanless, 1987 – Borneo
Mintonia ignota Logunov & Azarkina, 2008 – Thailand
Mintonia mackiei Wanless, 1984 – Borneo
Mintonia melinauensis Wanless, 1984 – Borneo
Mintonia nubilis Wanless, 1984 – Borneo
Mintonia protuberans Wanless, 1984 – Singapore
Mintonia ramipalpis (Thorell, 1890) – Indonesia (Java, Sumatra, Borneo)
Mintonia silvicola Wanless, 1987 – Malaysia
Mintonia tauricornis Wanless, 1984 (type) – Indonesia (Sumatra, Borneo)

References

Salticidae genera
Salticidae
Spiders of Asia